Pedro Amat Fontanals (born July 13, 1940) is a former Spanish field hockey player. He captured the bronze medal with the Men's National Team at the 1960 Summer Olympics in Rome, Italy.

References

External links
 

1940 births
Living people
Spanish male field hockey players
Olympic field hockey players of Spain
Field hockey players at the 1960 Summer Olympics
Field hockey players at the 1964 Summer Olympics
Field hockey players at the 1968 Summer Olympics
Olympic bronze medalists for Spain
Olympic medalists in field hockey
Medalists at the 1960 Summer Olympics
20th-century Spanish people